St Michael's Church, Hoveringham is a Grade II listed parish church in the Church of England in Hoveringham, Nottinghamshire, England.

History
The church contains a 12th-century tympanum, but was largely rebuilt in 1865 by William Knight of Nottingham.

It is in a joint parish with:
St Mary's Church, Bleasby
St James' Church, Halloughton
Priory Church of St. Peter, Thurgarton

Burials
Elizabeth Fitzalan, Duchess of Norfolk and her third husband, Sir Robert Goushill (or Gousell) in the Goushill tomb

Organ
An organ was installed in June 1891 by Charles Lloyd. This was replaced in the early 1970s by an organ from elsewhere installed by Henry Groves & Son. A specification of the organ can be found on the National Pipe Organ Register.

References

Church of England church buildings in Nottinghamshire
Hoveringham